NGC 2217 is a nearly face-on lenticular galaxy of about 100 thousand light-years across that lies roughly 65 million light years from Earth in the constellation of Canis Major. It is part of the NGC 2217 Group of galaxies. It is classified as a barred spiral galaxy.

A notable feature is the swirling shape of this galaxy. In its very concentrated central region we can see a distinctive, very luminous bar of stars within an oval ring. Further out, a set of tightly wound spiral arms almost form a circular ring around the galaxy.

Central bars play an important role in the development of a galaxy. They can, for example, funnel gas towards the center of the galaxy, helping to feed a central black hole, or to form new stars.

References

https://stardate.org/radio/program/2022-02-06

External links 
 

Barred lenticular galaxies
Ring galaxies
2217
Canis Major
018883